Leptoteuthis is a monospecific genus of cephalopod known primarily from gladii, with soft parts often preserved in the German Solnholfen limestone.

References

External links 
Image

Prehistoric cephalopod genera
Monotypic mollusc genera